The Ministry of Justice of the Republic of Serbia is the ministry in the Government of Serbia which is in the charge of justice. The current minister is Maja Popović, in office since 28 October 2020.

Subordinate institutions
There are several agencies and institutions that operate within the scope of the Ministry:
 Directorate for Management of confiscated property
 Office for Cooperation with Churches and Religious Communities
 Administration for the Enforcement of Criminal sanctions
 Supreme Court of Cassation
 Administrative Court
 Misdemeanor Court of Appeal
 Republic Public Prosecutor's Office
 Economic Appellate Court
 War Crimes Prosecutor's Office
 Public Attorney's Office
 Prosecutor's Office for Organized Crime
 Appellate Courts
 Higher Courts
 Basic Courts
 Misdemeanor Courts
 Economic courts
 Appellate Public Prosecutor's Offices
 Higher Public Prosecutor's Offices
 Basic Public Prosecutor's Offices
 Penitentiary institutions
 Judicial Academy

List of ministers

Ministers of Justice, 1945–1991
 Miloš Carević (1945–1947)
 Živan Dimitrijević (1947–1948)
 Radisav Nedeljković (1948–1951)
 Miloš Carević (1951)
 Milan Popović (1951–1953)
 (1954–1974)
 Miodrag Trifunović (1974–1982)
 Dragoljub Ćosić (1982–1986)
 Dragan Šaponjić (1986–1989)
 Sreten Vladisavljević (1989–1991)
 Predrag Todorović (1991)

Ministers of Justice, since 1991
Political Party:

|-
! colspan=8| Minister of Justice
|-

|-
! colspan=8| Minister of Justice and Public Administration
|-

|-
! colspan=8| Minister of Justice
|-

See also

 Justice ministry
 Politics of Serbia

References

External links
 
 Serbian ministries, etc – Rulers.org

Justice
1991 establishments in Serbia
Ministries established in 1991
Serbia